Lucas Cardoso may refer to:
 Lucas Cardoso (footballer, born 1994) (Lucas Ferreira Cardoso), Brazilian football forward
 Lucas Cardoso (footballer, born 2000) (Lucas Cardoso Moreira), Brazilian football midfielder